Mangalore tiles (also Mangalorean tiles) are a type of tile native to the city of Mangalore, India. Typically considered to be a part of Spanish and Italian architectural styles, the tiles were first introduced to India in 1860 by German missionaries of the Basel Mission of Switzerland, who also established weaving enterprises. Since that time, the industry has flourished in India with these red tiles, prepared from hard laterite clay, in great demand throughout the country. They are exported to Myanmar, Sri Lanka, and the Far East and even as far as East Africa, the Middle East, Europe, and Australia. These were the only tiles recommended for government buildings in India under the British Raj.

These tiles still define Mangalore's skyline and characterize its urban setting. They are a popular form of roofing and are preferred over concrete due to their good quality.

Etymology 
These tiles are native to Mangalore, a city in the former South Canara district on the western coast of India.  Hence they were named Mangalore tiles by the tile factory manufacturers.

History 

The German missionary Plebot (Georg Plebst in reality) set up the first tile factory at Mangalore in 1860, after he found large deposits of clay by the banks of the Gurupura (also Phalguni) and Nethravathi (also Bantwal) rivers. Currently Mphasis, An HP company has been established in this area.

Several other tile factories were established in the years that followed. In 1868, the Albuquerque tile factory producing these tiles was started by Mr.Pascal Albuquerque at Panemangalore in South Canara. These were the only tiles to be recommended for Government buildings in India during the British regime. The Chhatrapati Shivaji Terminus, a World Heritage Site is also topped with these tiles due to their excellent quality and were preferred over Bombay tiles by the structure's architect Frederick William Stevens.

Since the opening of the Albuquerque tile factory, Mangaloreans have been actively involved in manufacturing these red Mangalore tiles. In 1878, it was followed by the Alvares tile factory established by Mr.Simon Alvares of Bombay at Mangalore. The tiles produced by the factory were in great demand throughout the Indian subcontinent and East Africa. Abundant deposits of clay, plenty of firewood from the Western Ghats and cheap skilled labour helped the industry flourish. By the 1900s there were around 25 tile factories situated in and around Mangalore. By 1994 around 75 tile factories were present in Mangalore. As per the years 1991—1992 out of a selected 12 tile factories, 6 were owned by Hindus and the other 6 by Christians. The factories along with these tiles also manufactured materials such as ridges, limestone and bricks.

The prominent tile factories in Mangalore of the bygone era were
1) The Common Wealth Trust Ltd (Established by Basel Mission in 1860) - This is supposed to be the first tile factory in Mangalore and thereby India.
2) A Albuquerque and Sons (Established in 1868).
3) Alvares Tile factory (Established by Simon Alvares in 1878)
4) Hammer Tiles (Established by Mahalakshmi traders in 1889).
5) Hamidiah Tile works (Established by Adhyaksha H. Koragappa(Founder of Kudroli Shree Gokarnanatheshwara Temple Mangalore) and C.Abdurahiman in 1905)
6) King George Tiles (Established in 1905).
7) JH Morgan and son. 
8) Rego and sons.
9) Pioneer Tiles.
10) BK Tiles.

The Calicut Tile Co. (CTC) was the first fully mechanised roofing tile manufacturer in India. It was started in the year 1878. Besides roofing tiles, CTC also manufactures ceiling tiles, hourdees, hollow blocks, paver tiles, decorative garden tiles and terracotta products.  The company is currently fully operational. The products CTC at Ferok are known and sold under the brand name QUEEN. They have another factory in the state of Karnataka. The products are known under the brand name KING. 

In 2007, the industry suffered a loss with about 10 tile factories shutting down due to scarcity of raw materials like clay, and as factories struggled to find skilled and cooperative workers.

Quality and Usage

They provide excellent ventilation especially during summer and are aesthetically pleasing as well. Some of them are especially made to be used for roofing kitchens (for the smoke to escape) and bathrooms. Over a period of time, these tiles become dark to black from constant exposure to soot and smoke. Clay tiles offer natural insulation, thereby reducing the expense on electricity for heating or cooling as the case may be. 

Since these clay tiles are molded under extreme heat, they are resistant to damage or destruction from fire. 

These red colored clay tiles, unique in shape and size, are quite famous and are exported to all the corners of world. They are unique and are made and available in different shapes and sizes depending on the users' need. Clay tiles are often white, yellow, orange or brown in color. However, they can be colored or styled according to one’s preference by spraying enamel over the tile once it has been colored before baking it in the kiln. 

These tiles are not only eco-friendly but also cheap, durable and costs only one third of that of cement. Some of the buildings which are over 100 years old still have tile roofing. 

Clay tiles are most apt for roofing solutions in coastal areas, and in regions that experience heavy rainfall. Clay tiles for a sloping roof offer excellent water proofing in regions where it rains quite often. It is corrosion resistant, and has superior longevity compared to other materials. The Mangalore tiles are generally placed inclined at forty five degrees. The tiles get their robust red colour due to the high proportion of iron compound found in the laterite clay. These kinds of tiles are most popularly used in Canara, Goa, Kerala, and the Konkan.

Preparation
First, enough clay is collected, placed in a mold and is precisely cut to measurement. Then, the molded piece of clay with required length and thickness (or shape) is placed on another machine which puts the factory logo and shapes it into a tile.
Then, any extra clay is removed by hand and sent or carried for firing and later glazing. It is heated in a kiln, and the density of the clay tile is determined by the length of time and temperature at which it is heated. 

Clay tiles are often white, yellow, orange or brown in color. However, they can be colored or styled according to one’s preference by spraying enamel over the tile once it has been colored before baking it in the kiln. The extreme heat of the kiln permanently bonds the color and enamel to the tile, ensuring the color does not peel or fade away over time.

It was interesting, to say the least to see how both men and women worked cooperatively to produce the final product. Once fired and glazed, it is ready, and is stored for transport/shipping.

Trade and commerce

Tiles are exported to east Asia, Europe, Australia, Africa, and the Middle East.

Notes

A different type of J H MORGAN roof tile found in Old Suriyani church at Chenganoor which is much older than the photos shown in the photo.

References

Soil-based building materials
Economy of Mangalore
Roofing materials
Geographical indications in Karnataka